Krokowa  (formerly ) is a village in Puck County, Pomeranian Voivodeship, in northern Poland. It is the seat of the gmina (administrative district) called Gmina Krokowa.

For details of the history of the region, see History of Pomerania.

The village has a population of 3,500.

References

Villages in Puck County